Luftkurort, literally meaning 'air spa', is a title given to towns or cities in Austria, Switzerland, and Germany which are health resorts which have a climate and air quality which is considered beneficial to health and recovery.    Tests are repeated on a regular basis to ensure that standards of air quality are maintained. A municipality with this classification can charge a health resort tax for all guests who spend the night there.

See also
 Nature therapy
 Sanatorium (resort)
 Hill station

References

Spas
Tourism in Germany